Dave Cecchini is an American football coach. He was announced as the 27th head coach for Bucknell University in February 2019. Previously, in 2014, he was hired as head football coach at Valparaiso University in Valparaiso, Indiana.  Before coming to Valparaiso, Cecchini worked as an assistant coach at Harvard University, The Citadel, The Military College of South Carolina, and  Lehigh University.  Cecchini graduated from Lehigh in 1995.

Head coaching record

References

External links
 Bucknell profile
 Valparaiso profile

Year of birth missing (living people)
Living people
American football wide receivers
Bucknell Bison football coaches
The Citadel Bulldogs football coaches
Harvard Crimson football coaches
Lehigh Mountain Hawks football coaches
Lehigh Mountain Hawks football players
Valparaiso Beacons football coaches